Tala is a town in the north of the Canelones Department of southern Uruguay.

Tala is also the name of the municipality to which the city belongs.

Geography

Location

History
Tala was founded as a "Pueblo" (village) by Decree of 2 May 1860. On 15 May 1925, its status was elevated to "Villa" (town) by the Act of Ley Nº 7.837. On 28 April 1960, its status was further elevated to "Ciudad" (city) by the Act of Ley Nº 12.708.

Population
According to the 2011 census, Tala had a population of 5,089. In 2010, the Intendencia de Canelones had estimated a population of 9,499 for the municipality during the elections.

 
Source: Instituto Nacional de Estadística de Uruguay

Places of worship
 Parish Church of the Most Holy Savior (Roman Catholic)

Notable people
Conrado Villegas (1841-1884), general
Hugo Alfaro (1917-1996), journalist
José Óscar Herrera (born 1965), footballer
Cristhian Stuani (born 1986), footballer

References

External links
INE map of Tala

Populated places in the Canelones Department